The 2010–11 New Zealand V8 season was the twelfth season of the series, under the NZV8 guise. The season began at Pukekohe on 5 November 2010 and finished at the Hamilton Street Circuit on 17 April 2011 after seven championship meetings. John McIntyre won the championship by 81 points over 2nd placed Craig Baird, 3rd placed Andy Booth, and 4th placed Angus Fogg.

Teams and drivers
 All teams must adhere to the series' car specification rules. All Holdens must be based upon the body shells of its VT, VX or VY Commodores, with upgrades available to replicate it to a VZ or VE. Similarly for Ford, their cars must be based upon the AU Falcon, with options to replicate the BA.

Calendar

Championship standings

References

External links
 The official website of NZV8

NZ Touring Cars Championship seasons
V8 season
V8 season